The chemical compound 1,3-dioxetanedione, or 1,3-dioxacyclobutane-2,4-dione is a hypothetical oxide of carbon with formula C2O4.  It can be considered a cyclic dimer of carbon dioxide (CO2) or as a double ketone of 1,3-dioxetane (1,3-dioxacyclobutane).

Theoretical calculations indicate that the compound would be extremely unstable at room temperature (half-life of less than 1.1 μs) but may be stable at −196 °C.

References 

Oxocarbons
Dioxetanes
Hypothetical chemical compounds